DeaDBeeF is an audio player software available for Linux, Android and other Unix-like operating systems. DeaDBeeF is free and open-source software, except on Android.

History 

The player was first published in August 2009. Its author cited dissatisfaction with existing music players under Linux as the main reason for writing DeaDBeeF. The name is a reference to magic number 0xDEADBEEF.

Characteristics 

Among DeaDBeeF's functionalities are included:
 Support for formats MP3, FLAC, APE, TTA, Vorbis, WavPack, Musepack, AAC, ALAC, WMA, WAV, DTS, audio CD, many forms of module files and music from game consoles. TAK and Opus are supported via ffmpeg/libav.
 Cuesheet support, both in built-in format and external files. iso.wv support.
 Character encodings Windows-1251 and ISO 8859-1 are supported in addition to UTF-8.
 The program doesn't have any dependencies on GNOME, KDE or gstreamer.
 Plug-in architecture.
 Gapless playback.
 Customizable systemd notifications (OSD).
 Read and write support for playlists in format M3U and PLS.
 Network playback of podcasts using SHOUTcast, Icecast, MMS, HTTP and FTP.
 Customizable global keyboard shortcuts.
 Tag support (read and write) for ID3v1, ID3v2, APEv2, Vorbis comments, iTunes.
 Mass tagging and flexible tagging (custom tags).
 High-quality resampling.
 Bit-perfect output under certain configurations. 
 Sound output via ALSA, PulseAudio and OSS.
 Scrobbling to last.fm, libre.fm or any GNU FM server.
 En masse transcoder.
 ReplayGain support.
 Multi-channel playback.
 18-band equalizer.
 Simple command-line user interface as well as graphical user interface implemented in GTK+ (version 2 or 3). The GUI is fully customizable.

See also 

 Comparison of audio player software

References

External links 

DeaDBeeF Player on Google Play

Audio players
2009 software
Android (operating system) software
Free software programmed in C
Audio player software that uses GTK
Cross-platform free software
Linux media players
Tag editors for Linux